In radio or television broadcasting, a director of network programming, orprogram director or director of programming in short, also called president of TV entertainment, senior vice president for TV programming or vice president of program scheduling, is a TV executive who, typically, selects the programs to air and plans the broadcasting schedule (broadcast programming), deciding what radio program or TV program will be broadcast and when. In addition of selecting the content that will be broadcast, it might also have a role in developing it. 

A program director's selections are based upon expertise in the media as well as knowledge of the target demographic. In some countries, the program director in commercial broadcasting is of even greater importance, since he makes a decisive decision about the economic success of the broadcasters. In so-called private television, the most important program directors were or are often the managing directors of the station, such as Les Moonves for CBS in the United States, or Anke Schäferkordt for RTL in Germany.

In a broadcasting network, there might be a separation between the news department and the programming department, in which case there is a news director oversighting the news department, in which the director of programming has no say.

See also 
 Dayparting
 Full-service radio

References 

Broadcasting occupations

it:Direttore di rete
de:Programmdirektor